Angelika Szymańska (born 16 October 1999) is a Polish judoka who competes in international judo competitions. She is a two-time Grand Slam bronze medalist, a European U23 champion and European Junior silver medalist. Szymańska began judo in 2007 and was trained by Olympic silver medalist Aneta Szczepańska and Roman Stawisiński.

References

External links
 

1999 births
Living people
People from Włocławek
Polish female judoka
21st-century Polish women